Wonder boy or Wonderboy may refer to:

Film
Wonder Boys (film), the 2000 film starring Michael Douglas and Tobey Maguire, adapted from Michael Chabon's novel (see below)
Wonder Boy (film), 2017 film directed by Dick Lee and starring Benjamin Kheng
Berting Labra (1933-2009), Filipino actor also known as Wonder Boy

Literature
Wonderboy, a novel by Henrik H. Langeland
Wonderboy, the baseball bat used by Roy Hobbs, the main character in Bernard Malamud's novel The Natural (and in the film adaptation)
Wonder Boy (comics), two fictional superheroes
Wonder Boys, a 1995 novel by Michael Chabon

Music
"Wonder Boy", a song by Lesley Gore
"Wonderboy" (The Kinks song)
"Wonderboy" (Tenacious D song)
"Wonder Boy" (After School song)
Keith "Wonderboy" Johnson (1972–2022), American gospel singer-songwriter

Sports
Wonder Boys, the nickname of the Arkansas Tech University men's athletic teams
Jeff Gordon (born 1971), NASCAR driver
Stephen Thompson (fighter) (born 1983), mixed martial arts fighter signed with the UFC
Luka Dončić, professional basketball player for the Dallas Mavericks

Video games
Wonder Boy, a video game series by Sega
Wonder Boy (video game), the first game in the series

See also
Boy Wonder (disambiguation)
Wonder Man (disambiguation)